Walnut Springs High School, also known as Walnut Springs School, is a public high school located in Walnut Springs, Texas (United States). It is the sole high school in the Walnut Springs Independent School District and is classified as a 2A school by the UIL. In 2015, the school was rated "Met Standard" by the Texas Education Agency.

Athletics
The Walnut Springs Hornets compete in the following sports:

Basketball
Cross Country
6-Man Football
Golf
Tennis
Track and Field

References

External links
 Official website

Schools in Bosque County, Texas
Public high schools in Texas